The women's cross-country cycling event at the 2016 Summer Olympics in Rio de Janeiro took place at the Mountain Bike Centre on 20 August.

The medals were presented by Tricia Smith, IOC member, Canada and Emin Muftuoglu, Member of the UCI Management Committee.

Format
The competition began at 12:30 pm with a mass-start. The length of the course was 29.67 km (0.57 km + 6 laps of 4.85 km each).

Schedule
All times are Brasília time

Start list and result

References

Women's cross-country
2016
2016 in women's mountain biking
Women's events at the 2016 Summer Olympics